Denis Vitalyevich Shevchuk (born 23 January 1992) is a Russian former football player. Until 2014 he held Ukrainian citizenship as Denys Vitaliyovych Shevchuk.

Club career
He made his debut in the Russian Football National League for FC Baltika Kaliningrad on 24 September 2017 in a game against FC Tom Tomsk and scored the winning goal in his team 2–1 victory.

On 26 June 2019, Shevchuk signed for Ararat Yerevan. On 5 December 2019, Shevchuk left Ararat Moscow after making one appearance for the club.

References

External links
 Profile by Russian Football National League
 Denis Shevchuk at CFU
 

1992 births
People from Talne
Living people
Serhiy Bubka College of Olympic Reserve alumni
Ukrainian footballers
Russian footballers
Russian expatriate footballers
Ukrainian expatriate footballers
Association football forwards
FC Shakhtar Donetsk players
FC Olimpik Donetsk players
FC Feniks-Illichovets Kalinine players
FC Desna Chernihiv players
FC Dynamo Khmelnytskyi players
FC Makiyivvuhillya Makiyivka players
FC Shakhtar-3 Donetsk players
FC Baltika Kaliningrad players
FC Ararat Moscow players
FC Ararat Yerevan players
FC TSK Simferopol players
Ukrainian First League players
Ukrainian Second League players
Ukrainian expatriate sportspeople in Armenia
Russian expatriate sportspeople in Armenia
Expatriate footballers in Armenia
Sportspeople from Cherkasy Oblast